Elgeyo escarpment  is a fault-scarp caused by post-Miocene faulting. Miocene beds are still visible. The escarpment is part of the western wall of the Great Rift Valley.

There is the highland plateau, which rises gradually  to 3,350 meters above sea level, on the Cherangani Hills. In the intermediate zone is the Elgeyo Escarpment which rapidly gives way to the lower Kerio Valley. The yearly rainfall in the escarpment area ranges between 100–140 cm.

References

Escarpments of Kenya
Great Rift Valley